Pebas District is one of four districts of the province Mariscal Ramón Castilla in Peru. Its name is derived from Peba, an indigenous ethnic group and language.

References

Districts of the Mariscal Ramón Castilla Province
Districts of the Loreto Region